FK Moravac Mrštane is a football club based in Mrštane, Serbia. They compete in the Jablanica District League, the fifth tier of the national league system.

History
The club was founded on 21 May 1947. They finished as Niš Zone League champions in the 2011–12 season and earned promotion to the third tier. The club won the Serbian League East in the 2013–14 season and got promoted to the Serbian First League, reaching the second tier for the first time in history. However, after finishing 13th in the 2014–15 season, they were immediately relegated back to the Serbian League East. The club would spend the next six seasons in the third tier, before suffering relegation to the fourth tier in 2021.

Honours
Serbian League East (Tier 3)
 2013–14
Niš Zone League (Tier 4)
 2011–12

Seasons

Notable players
This is a list of players who have played at full international level.
  Tihomir Kostadinov
For a list of all FK Moravac Mrštane players with a Wikipedia article, see :Category:FK Moravac Mrštane players.

References

External links
 Club page at Srbijasport

1947 establishments in Serbia
Association football clubs established in 1947
Football clubs in Serbia
Sport in Leskovac